Jacobus Johannes Hoogveld (August 4, 1884 in Arnhem – February 17, 1948 in Arnhem) was a Dutch athlete, who competed at the 1908 Summer Olympics in London.

In the 100 metres, Hoogveld took third place in his first round heat and did not advance to the semifinals.  He took third and last place in his preliminary heat of the 200 metres to be eliminated in that event as well.

Hoogveld lost his preliminary heat in the 400 metres as well, placing second of two in the race.

References

Sources
 
 
 

1884 births
1948 deaths
Dutch male sprinters
Olympic athletes of the Netherlands
Athletes (track and field) at the 1908 Summer Olympics
Sportspeople from Arnhem
19th-century Dutch people
20th-century Dutch people